Sir John Henry Grattan Esmonde, 16th Baronet, of the Esmonde baronets, (27 June 1928 – 16 May 1987) was an Irish Fine Gael politician. A Senior Counsel by profession, Esmonde was elected to Dáil Éireann as a Fine Gael Teachta Dála (TD) for the Wexford constituency at the 1973 general election. He lost his seat at the 1977 general election. The outgoing Government appointed him as a judge of the Circuit Court. He was assigned to the Western Circuit, and served as the Circuit judge there until his death.

His uncle Sir John Esmonde, 14th Baronet, was a Fine Gael TD for Wexford from 1937 to 1951 and his father Sir Anthony Esmonde, 15th Baronet, was a Fine Gael TD for Wexford from 1951 to 1973.

See also
Families in the Oireachtas

References

External links

1928 births
1987 deaths
Fine Gael TDs
Irish Senior Counsel
Members of the 20th Dáil
Baronets in the Baronetage of Ireland
Politicians from County Wexford
Irish barristers
Circuit Court (Ireland) judges
People educated at Blackrock College
Alumni of University College Dublin
Alumni of King's Inns